Bisa Grant (born July 10, 1976) is an American athlete who specialized in the 100 metres hurdles. In 60 metres hurdles, she finished seventh at the 2001 IAAF World Indoor Championships in Lisbon.

See also
 Women's 100 metres hurdles world record progression

References

External links
 

1976 births
Living people
American female hurdlers
Place of birth missing (living people)
21st-century American women